Ernst Rotmund (26 November 1886 – 2 March 1955) was a German actor. He appeared in more than one hundred films from 1917 to 1954.

Selected filmography

References

External links 

1886 births
1955 deaths
German male film actors
German male silent film actors
People from Toruń
20th-century German male actors